The Ackerhurst–Eipperhurst Dairy Barn is located at 15220 Military Road near Bennington, Nebraska, United States. Built in 1935 by Adolf Otte in the Gambrel (also known as Dutch Gambrel) style, the Barn was designated a "Landmark" by the City of Omaha Landmarks Heritage Preservation Commission on March 5, 2002, and listed on the National Register of Historic Places later that month.

To ensure the quality of the products, owner Anthony W. Ackerman put into place a few important factors. A veterinarian was on duty at all times, the milking machinery was state of the art stainless steel, and only the highest quality of hay was given to the cows.

The roof has a hay hood at each end.

The Barn at the Ackerhurst Dairy Farm 

In 2015, the barn on the Ackerhurst property was sold and converted into a small event venue. The first phase of a renovation was completed in 2016 after which small events were held. More extensive renovations were completed in 2017. As of 2021, the venue hosts events such as weddings, receptions, corporate meetings, and charity fundraisers. It seats up to 400 people.

See also
History of Omaha
Landmarks in Omaha

References

External links
 Photos
 

Barns on the National Register of Historic Places in Nebraska
Buildings and structures completed in 1935
Omaha Landmarks
Barns with hay hoods
National Register of Historic Places in Douglas County, Nebraska
1935 establishments in Nebraska